The 1987 NCAA Division I Men's Basketball Championship Game was the final round of the 1987 NCAA Division I men's basketball tournament and determined the national champion for the 1986-87 NCAA Division I men's basketball season  The 1987 National Title Game was played on March 30, 1987 at the Louisiana Superdome in New Orleans, Louisiana. The 1987 National Title Game was played between the 1987 Midwest Regional Champions, #1-seeded Indiana and the 1987 East Regional Champions, #2-seeded Syracuse.

"One Shining Moment", which serves as the closing song for the NCAA Tournament coverage, was played for the first time after this game. It was originally slated to debut after Super Bowl XXI, which also aired on CBS, but was shelved due to player interviews taking up too much time and the network scheduling a primetime show immediately following said game.

Participating teams

Syracuse

East
Syracuse (2) 79, Georgia Southern (15) 73
Syracuse 104, Western Kentucky (10) 86
Syracuse 87, Florida (6) 81
Syracuse 79, North Carolina (1) 75
Final Four
Syracuse 77, Providence (6) 63

Indiana

Midwest
Indiana (1) 92, Fairfield (16) 58
Indiana 107, Auburn (8) 90
Indiana 88, Duke (5) 82
Indiana 77, LSU (10) 76
Final Four
Indiana 97, UNLV (1) 93

Starting lineups

Game summary

Syracuse led, 73–72, with 28 seconds remaining, but Derrick Coleman missed the front end of a one-and-one, setting the stage for the game-winner from Keith Smart, who hit a jumper over Howard Triche with four seconds left.  By the time Syracuse called timeout to set up a final play, there was one second remaining.  A final desperation length-of-the-court pass was intercepted by Smart, who flung the ball into the stands, and the Hoosiers celebrated their national championship win.

References

NCAA Division I Men's Basketball Championship Game
NCAA Division I Men's Basketball Championship Games
Indiana Hoosiers men's basketball
Syracuse Orange men's basketball
College sports tournaments in Louisiana
Basketball competitions in New Orleans
NCAA Division I Men's Basketball Championship Game
NCAA Division I Basketball Championship Game, 1987
NCAA Division I Basketball Championship Game